Matsunami (written: 松波 or 松浪) is a Japanese surname. Notable people with the surname include:

, Japanese politician
, Japanese politician
, Japanese footballer and manager

See also
Matsunami Station, a former railway station in Noto, Hōsu District, Ishikawa Prefecture, Japan

Japanese-language surnames